Karl Kindsmüller (9 April 1876 in Poikam (now part of Bad Abbach) – 26 August 1955 in Regensburg) was a German priest and composer. He was ordained priest in 1900. He was teacher at several gymnasiums in Regensburg, lecturer at the School of Church Music, and part-time composer. His most famous work was composing the melody for Cordula Wöhler's hymn "Segne du, Maria" after the author's death.

References

External links 
 
 Kindsmüller, Karl (in German) Deutsche Biographie

1876 births
1955 deaths
German composers
19th-century German Roman Catholic priests
20th-century German Roman Catholic priests
German music educators